is a former Japanese football player who last played for Ococias Kyoto AC.

Club statistics
Updated to 19 January 2019.

Honours
 Blaublitz Akita
 J3 League (1): 2017

References

External links

Profile at Thespakusatsu Gunma
Profile at Blaublitz Akita
Profile at Giravanz Kitakyushu

1985 births
Living people
Japan University of Economics alumni
Association football people from Kagoshima Prefecture
Japanese footballers
J2 League players
J3 League players
Japan Football League players
Thespakusatsu Gunma players
FC Machida Zelvia players
Blaublitz Akita players
Giravanz Kitakyushu players
Nara Club players
Association football defenders